Sideroxylon bullatum is a species of plant in the family Sapotaceae. It is endemic to Jamaica.  It is threatened by habitat loss.

References

bullatum
Vulnerable plants
Endemic flora of Jamaica
Taxonomy articles created by Polbot